Phytelephas tumacana is a species of palm tree. It is endemic to Colombia, where it grows in forests near rivers. It is threatened by the destruction of habitat for agriculture.

References

External links

tumacana
Endemic flora of Colombia
Endangered plants
Taxonomy articles created by Polbot